The 2021 Kentucky Wildcats baseball team represents the University of Kentucky in the 2021 NCAA Division I baseball season. Kentucky is competing in the Eastern Division of the Southeastern Conference (SEC). The Wildcats play their home games at Kentucky Proud Park.

Previous season

The Wildcats finished 11-6 overall, and 0–0 in the conference. The season was prematurely cut short due to the COVID-19 pandemic.

Personnel

Roster

Coaching staff

Schedule and results

† Indicates the game does not count toward the 2019 Southeastern Conference standings.
*Rankings are based on the team's current ranking in the D1Baseball poll.

Record vs. conference opponents

2021 MLB draft

References

External links 
 Kentucky Baseball

Kentucky
Kentucky Wildcats baseball seasons
Kentucky Wildcats baseball